Bratsberg is an unincorporated community in Fillmore County, in the U.S. state of Minnesota.

History
A post office was established at Bratsberg in 1862, and remained in operation until it was discontinued in 1907. The community was named after the county of Bratsberg, in Norway.

References

Unincorporated communities in Fillmore County, Minnesota
1862 establishments in Minnesota
Unincorporated communities in Minnesota